Mona Barthel and Laura Siegemund were the defending champions, but Barthel chose not to participate this year. Siegemund played alongside Antonia Lottner, but lost in the first round to Annika Beck and Xenia Knoll.

Kiki Bertens and Johanna Larsson won the title, defeating Monica Niculescu and Patricia Maria Țig in the final, 4–6, 7–5, [11–9].

Seeds

Draw

References 
 Draw

BGL Luxembourg Open - Doubles
Luxembourg Open
2016 in Luxembourgian tennis